The Cheshire Women's cricket team is the women's representative cricket team for the English historic county of Cheshire. They joined the Women's County Championship in 1998 and competed in the tournament until 2016, as well as competing in the Women's Twenty20 Cup between 2009 and 2019. The team no longer competes at senior county level. They are partnered with the regional side North West Thunder.

History

1930–1937: Early History
The first recorded match involving Cheshire Women took place in 1930, which they lost to Durham Women. After this, they played various one-off matches, often combined with neighbouring Lancashire, as Lancashire and Cheshire, under which they competed in the Women's Area Championship and the first Women's County Championship, in 1997.

1998– : National Competition
Cheshire Women joined the County Championship in 1998, replacing Lancashire and Cheshire Women, and won Division 3 in their first season. Since then, Cheshire bounced between Divisions 2 and 3, with their longest stay in Division 2 being between 2009 and 2014. They also managed two successive promotions in 2004 and 2005. Cheshire Women withdrew from the County Championship after the 2016 season, after which they only participated in the Women's Twenty20 Cup, in which they were often in the lowest tier of the competition, but did win promotion to Division 2 in 2017. Since 2019, Cheshire have not competed at senior county level.

Players

Notable players
Players who have played for Cheshire and played internationally are listed below, in order of first international appearance (given in brackets):

 Laura Newton (1997)
 Sarah Collyer (1998)
 Megan White (1999)
 Zehmarad Afzal (2000)
 Lauren Griffiths (2010)
 Sophie Ecclestone (2016)

Seasons

Women's County Championship

Women's Twenty20 Cup

See also
 Cheshire County Cricket Club
 North West Thunder

References

Cricket in Cheshire
Women's cricket teams in England
Cheshire County Cricket Club